There have been two ships of the Royal Navy named HMS Opal:

 , an Emerald-class steam corvette launched in 1875 and sold for scrap in 1891.
 , an  launched in 1915 and wrecked in the North Sea in 1918.

Royal Navy ship names